is a Japanese football player. He plays for Young Lions as a central-midfielder or left-winger.

Career
Kan Kobayashi joined J1 League club FC Tokyo in 2017.

Career statistics

Club
.

Notes

International Statistics

U18 International caps

References

External links

1999 births
Living people
Association football people from Tokyo
University of Tsukuba alumni
Japanese footballers
Japan youth international footballers
J3 League players
FC Tokyo players
FC Tokyo U-23 players
Albirex Niigata Singapore FC players
Association football midfielders
Japanese expatriate footballers
Japanese expatriate sportspeople in Singapore
Expatriate footballers in Singapore